The 2018 GP Miguel Induráin was the 65th edition of the GP Miguel Induráin cycle race and was held on 31 March 2018. The race started and finished in Estella. The race was won by Alejandro Valverde.

Teams
Seventeen teams were invited to take part in the race. These included three UCI WorldTeams, seven UCI Professional Continental teams, and seven UCI Continental teams.

Results

References

2018
2018 UCI Europe Tour
2018 in Spanish road cycling